Stephen Farr (born 1967 in London) is a British organist who is currently the Chief Examiner at the Royal College of Organists and the Director of Music at All Saints, Margaret Street.

Early life
Farr was born in 1967 in London and grew up in the South East. He attended Eltham College in London, and then, from 1984, he attended Clare College, Cambridge as organ scholar. He graduated with Double First Class Honours in music before continuing at Clare to earn his MPhil in Musicology. He also holds a PhD in music performance from the University of Surrey, where he studied under John Butt and completed a thesis on Judith Bingham's work. Farr was among the youngest musicians ever to receive funding from the Countess of Munster Musical Trust. His tutors in London include Robert Munns and David Sanger, and receipt of the Worshipful Company of Musicians' W.T. Best Scholarship allowed him to study under Piet Kee in Haarlem, Netherlands and Hans Fagius in Copenhagen, Denmark.

Career
In the years following his time at Clare College, Farr won the Royal College of Organists Performer of the Year Award (1988) as well as a number of international prizes. He worked as sub-organist and later lecturer at Christ Church, Oxford (1990—1996), Assistant Master of Music at Winchester Cathedral, and organist and Master of the Choristers at Guildford Cathedral (1999—2007) He left Guildford in 2007 to freelance and to serve as the Director of Music at St. Paul's Church in Knightsbridge and Music Consultant at Worcester College in Oxford. In spring 2020, he left St. Paul's to join All Saints, Margaret Street as Director of Music.

His concerto work has included engagements with the Bournemouth Symphony Orchestra, Ulster Orchestra, and the London Mozart Players; and he has performed at the Sydney Opera House as a concerto soloist with the Australian Baroque Orchestra. Farr has performed a number of world premieres for famous composers, including Judith Bingham's The Everlasting Crown in 2011 at the Royal Albert Hall; Thomas Hyde's Improvisation on Puernatus in 2012 as part of Worcester College Choir's 2012 CD This Christmas Night; and Cecilia McDowall's First Flight in 2021, performed online during the COVID-19 pandemic. He has also led and continues to lead a number of ensembles, including Florilegium, the Bach Choir, BBC Singers, BBC Concert Orchestra, English Concert, London Baroque Soloists, Royal Philharmonic Orchestra, Wallace Collection, Endymion Ensemble the Orchestra of the Age of Enlightenment, Britten Sinfonia, the Academy of Ancient Music, and Polyphony. Among the many places he has performed are Westminster Abbey, Odense Cathedral, Notre-Dame de Paris, Grote of Sint-Laurenskerk, and Århus Domkirke.

In 1997, Farr collaborated with Thomas Adès for EMI's release of Under Hamelin Hill. In 2004, he commissioned David Briggs for a new organ symphony inspired by Maurice Duruflé's Requiem, which is set during a Missa pro defunctis.

Farr appeared at the BBC Proms in 2011, 2015, and 2017. He has also recorded several CDs for labels that include Hyperion Records, Priory Records, and Nimbus Records

Farr was appointed to Chief Examiner at the Royal College of Organists in 2017. He previously served as Music Director at Corpus Christi College, Oxford.

References

English classical organists
British male organists
Cathedral organists
Organ improvisers
People educated at Eltham College
Living people
21st-century organists
21st-century British male musicians
1967 births
Alumni of the University of Surrey
Male classical organists